Theresa Kavanagh (born October 10, 1957) is a Canadian politician. She was elected to Ottawa City Council representing Bay Ward in the 2018 Ottawa municipal election.

Kavanagh is the daughter of immigrants, having an Irish father and British mother. Her father was a steelworker at Stelco. She grew up in Hamilton, Ontario. She received a fine arts degree at the University of Guelph. In her youth, she joined Canada World Youth.

Kavanagh worked for a number of New Democratic Party Members of Parliament and worked for 21 years in the party's whip's office.

Kavanagh's first venture into electoral politics was a run for the New Democratic Party in the 1988 Canadian federal election in the riding of Ottawa West. She finished third, behind Liberal Marlene Catterall and the incumbent, David Daubney of the Progressive Conservatives.

Kavanagh was easily elected as a trustee, representing Zone 4 (Bay Ward) to the Ottawa-Carleton District School Board in the 2010 Ottawa municipal election and was easily re-elected in 2014. When Bay Ward incumbent councillor Mark Taylor retired in 2018, Kavanagh entered the race to replace him. On election day, Kavanagh won 55% of the vote, easily beating Don Dransfield, the husband of the incumbent Liberal MP, Anita Vandenbeld.

Kavanagh is married to Alex Cullen, who represented Bay Ward for many years on city and regional council and was also a Liberal-turned-NDP Member of Provincial Parliament from 1997 to 1999.

Electoral record

References

Living people
1957 births
Ottawa city councillors
University of Guelph alumni
Ontario school board trustees
New Democratic Party candidates for the Canadian House of Commons
Canadian people of Irish descent
Canadian people of British descent
Politicians from Hamilton, Ontario
Women municipal councillors in Canada